The Turmoil is a 1924 American silent melodrama film produced and distributed by Universal Pictures and directed by Hobart Henley. It is based on the novel, The Turmoil, by Booth Tarkington. A previous film of the novel, The Turmoil, by Metro Pictures, was released in 1916.

Plot
As described in a film magazine, James Sheridan, Sr. (Corrigan) has made himself the captain of many industries and the undisputed financial king of his city. He wants his three sons to be like him. Jim, Jr. (von Eltz), is willing. Roscoe (Hearn) is too willing, if he is to be happy with his passionate, selfish, trouble-making wife, Sybil (Percy). Bibbs (Hackathorne) is entirely unwilling. He is of a poetic nature and cares little for industry. Another family, high in social position but low in finances, lives near the Sheridans. There comes a point when Mary Vertrees (Boardman), the daughter, finds it necessary to seek a marriage with Jim Sheridan, Jr., to save the family name from financial disgrace. A sudden catastrophe in the gigantic warehouse building program of Jim Sheridan, Jr., kills him. Sheridan now looks to his other sons. Roscoe, usually a willing worker, is worried by his wife's actions. Sybil, though he does not know it, is in love with Bobby Lamhorn (Gibson). Roscoe breaks under the strain of worry and Sheridan is forced to consider Bibbs, the unreliable, as his heir and future captain of the Sheridan interests. Bibbs has made a friend of Mary Vertrees, a point which Sybil, the troublemaker, carefully notes. Sybil succeeds in breaking up Bibbs' tender romance and making out of him a silent recluse. He drives himself at business and soon is the real captain of the Sheridan interests, and later wins Mary.

Cast

Preservation
The Turmoil is preserved at the UCLA Film and Television Archive.

References

External links

1924 films
American silent feature films
Films directed by Hobart Henley
Films based on American novels
Films based on works by Booth Tarkington
Universal Pictures films
1924 drama films
Silent American drama films
American black-and-white films
Melodrama films
1920s American films